Doo Hyeon-seok (born 21 December 1995) is a South Korean footballer who plays as midfielder for Gwangju FC.

Career
Doo joined K League 2 side Gwangju FC before 2018 season starts.

References

1995 births
Living people
Association football midfielders
South Korean footballers
Gwangju FC players
K League 2 players
K League 1 players
Yonsei University alumni